This is a list of 100 species in Wormaldia, a genus of fingernet caddisflies in the family Philopotamidae.

Wormaldia species

 Wormaldia algirica Lestage, 1925 i c g
 Wormaldia ambigua Navas, 1916 i c g
 Wormaldia amyda Ross, 1956 g
 Wormaldia anilla (Ross, 1941) i c g
 Wormaldia arcopa Denning in Denning & Sykora, 1966 i c g
 Wormaldia arizonensis (Ling, 1938) i c g
 Wormaldia arriba Sipahiler, 1999 i c g
 Wormaldia artillac Sipahiler, 1999 i c g
 Wormaldia asterusia Malicky, 1972 g
 Wormaldia balcanica Kumanski, 1979 i c g
 Wormaldia beaumonti Schmid, 1952 g
 Wormaldia bilamellata Sun, 1997 i c g
 Wormaldia bulgarica Novak, 1971 i c g
 Wormaldia cantabrica Gonzalez & Botosaneanu, 1983 i c g
 Wormaldia charalambi Malicky, 1980 i c g
 Wormaldia chinensis (Ulmer, 1932) i c g
 Wormaldia clavella Mey, 1995 i c g
 Wormaldia congina Malicky & Chantaramongkol, 1993 i c g
 Wormaldia copiosa (McLachlan, 1868) i c g
 Wormaldia coreana Kumanski, 1992 i c g
 Wormaldia cornuta Bueno-Soria & Holzenthal, 1986 i c g
 Wormaldia corvina (McLachlan, 1884) i c g
 Wormaldia dampfi Ross & King in Ross, 1956 i c g
 Wormaldia dissita Gibbs, 1973 i c g
 Wormaldia dorsata Ross & King in Ross, 1956 i c g
 Wormaldia echinata Tobias, 1995 i c g
 Wormaldia endonima Ross & King in Ross, 1956 i c g
 Wormaldia ephestion Schmid, 1991 i c g
 Wormaldia esperonis Ross & King in Ross, 1956 i c g
 Wormaldia extensa Kimmins, 1955 i c g
 Wormaldia fletcheri Kimmins, 1959 i c g
 Wormaldia fujinoensis Kobayashi, 1980 i c g
 Wormaldia gabriella (Banks, 1930) i c g
 Wormaldia gardensis Sipahiler, 1999 i c g
 Wormaldia gesugta Schmid, 1968 i c g
 Wormaldia hamata Denning, 1951 i c g
 Wormaldia hemsinensis Sipahiler, 1987 i c g
 Wormaldia ikizdere Sipahiler, 2000 i c g
 Wormaldia insignis (Martynov, 1912) i c g
 Wormaldia inthanonensis Malicky & Chantaramongkol, 1993 i c g
 Wormaldia joosti Kumanski, 1980 i c g
 Wormaldia juliani Kumanski, 1979 i c g
 Wormaldia kadowakii Kobayashi, 1980 i c g
 Wormaldia kakopetros Malicky, 1972 g
 Wormaldia kakopteros Malicky, 1972 i c g
 Wormaldia khourmai Schmid, 1959 i c g
 Wormaldia kimminsi Botosaneanu, 1960 i c g
 Wormaldia kyana (Mosely, 1939) i c g
 Wormaldia lacerna Denning, 1958 i c g
 Wormaldia langohri Botosaneanu & Giudicelli, 2001 g
 Wormaldia laona Denning, 1989 i c g
 Wormaldia longicerca Kumanski, 1992 i c g
 Wormaldia longicornuta Mey, 1996 i c g
 Wormaldia longispina Tian & Li in Chen, 1993 i c g
 Wormaldia luma Bueno-Soria & Holzenthal, 1986 i c g
 Wormaldia lusitanica Gonzalez & Botosaneanu, 1983 i c g
 Wormaldia matagalpa Flint, 1995 i c g
 Wormaldia mediana McLachlan, 1878 i c g
 Wormaldia melanion Schmid, 1991 i c g
 Wormaldia moesta (Banks, 1914) i c b
 Wormaldia moselyi Kimmins, 1953 g
 Wormaldia muoihai Malicky, 1995 i c g
 Wormaldia muoimot Malicky, 1995 i c g
 Wormaldia nigrorosea Schmid, 1991 i c g
 Wormaldia niiensis Kobayashi, 1985 i c g
 Wormaldia occidea (Ross, 1938) i c g
 Wormaldia occipitalis (Pictet, 1834) i c g
 Wormaldia oconee Morse in Morse, Hamilton & Hoffman, 1989 i c g
 Wormaldia pachita Denning, 1956 i c g
 Wormaldia palma Flint, 1991 i c g
 Wormaldia pauliani Ross, 1956 i c g
 Wormaldia planae Ross & King in Ross, 1956 i c g
 Wormaldia prolixa Flint, 1991 i c g
 Wormaldia pulla (McLachlan, 1878) i c g
 Wormaldia quadriphylla Sun in Yang, Sun & Wang, 1997 i c g
 Wormaldia recta (Ulmer, 1930) i c
 Wormaldia relicta (Martynov, 1935) i c g
 Wormaldia rufiventris Ulmer, 1908 i c g
 Wormaldia saekiensis Kobayashi, 1980 i c g
 Wormaldia saldetica Botosaneanu & Gonzalez, 1984 i c g
 Wormaldia serratosioi Vaillant, 1974 i c g
 Wormaldia shawnee (Ross, 1938) i c g
 Wormaldia simulans Kimmins, 1955 i c g
 Wormaldia sinocornuta Mey, 1996 i c g
 Wormaldia spinifera Hwang, 1957 i c g
 Wormaldia spinosa Ross, 1956 g
 Wormaldia strota (Ross, 1938) i c g
 Wormaldia subnigra McLachlan, 1865 i c g
 Wormaldia sumuharana Kobayashi, 1980 i c g
 Wormaldia tarasca Bueno-Soria & Holzenthal, 1986 i c g
 Wormaldia therapion Schmid, 1991 i c g
 Wormaldia thyria Denning, 1950 i c g
 Wormaldia triangulifera McLachlan, 1878 i c g
 Wormaldia uonumana Kobayashi, 1980 i c g
 Wormaldia vargai Malicky, 1981 i c g
 Wormaldia variegata Mosely, 1930 i c g
 Wormaldia viganoi Moretti & Taticchi, 1992 g
 Wormaldia yakuensis Kobayashi, 1980 i c g
 Wormaldia yavuzi Sipahiler, 1996 i c g
 Wormaldia yunotakiensis Kobayashi, 1980 i c g

Data sources: i = ITIS, c = Catalogue of Life, g = GBIF, b = Bugguide.net

References

Wormaldia
Articles created by Qbugbot